Antiochus II (flourished 1st century BC) was a man of Iranian and Greek descent. Antiochus II was a prince from the Kingdom of Commagene and the second son of King Antiochus I Theos of Commagene. He was the youngest brother of prince and future king Mithridates II of Commagene.

Very little is known of Antiochus II. In 29 BC, he was summoned to Rome by the Emperor Augustus for causing the assassination of an ambassador Mithridates II had sent to Rome. Antiochus II was subsequently executed on Augustus’ orders.

Sources
 
 
 
 
 
 
 

Kings of Commagene
1st-century BC rulers
29 BC deaths
Year of birth unknown
People executed by the Roman Republic
Executed royalty